The 2021 All Africa Music Awards (also known as AFRIMA), were held on November 21st, at the Eko Convention Centre in Lagos, Nigeria. This marked the fifth time in eight years that the venue is hosting the show. The show was hosted by South African actress Pearl Thusi, and British-Congolese comedian Eddie Kadi.

The ceremony, under the theme ‘Still We Sing’, was broadcast on DSTV channel 198, GOTV 98, HIPTV, TVC,  PlusTV Africa, AIT and AfroMusicPop among others. AFRIMA has taken place each year since 2014, except in 2020, owing to the coronavirus pandemic.

Iba One from Mali, and Wizkid were the most awarded artists of the night with five and three awards respectively, followed by Kenya's Nikita Kering. Beyoncé bagged the ‘Best Global Act’ award, as the D.R. Congo's Koffi Olomide was gifted the "Legend Award".

Winners and nominees
Nominations were announced on September 22, 2021 by the International Committee of All Africa Music Awards. Leading the list of nominees was South African duo, Blaq Diamond with eight nominations, followed by Focalistic with seven. Wizkid, Omah Lay and Gyakie followed, with six, four and three nominations respectively. Voting for the 28 continental and 10 regional award categories took place from September 27th 2021.

Winners are listed first and in bold.

References

African music awards